Lisa Oppenheim (born 1975) is an American multimedia artist.

Education
Lisa Oppenheim was born in New York City in the year of 1975. She earned her Bachelor's degree from Brown University in 1998, concentrating in Modern Culture and Media, Art and Semiotics. In 2001, she earned her MFA in Film and Video from Milton Avery Graduate School of the Arts, Bard College. She completed a Whitney Museum Independent Study Program in 2003. She also completed the Rijksakademie van beeldedne kunsten in Amsterdam from 2004-2006.

Work
Oppenheim's work plays with the process of creating photographs and film. Her pieces often question the documentary genre as well as the concept of an archives. In utilizing archival sources, she interrogates and reappropriates the archival function of narrative-making and -omitting, and how narrative and imagery are intertwined but ultimately separate.

In work such as Lunagrams, 2010, in which she exposed archival glass negatives using moonlight, Oppenheim experiments with time as a force of art and imagery. She has done works in fiber arts which is art created using strings, ropes and fabric. Her works in fiber arts were displayed in her Gramma exhibition at Tanya Bonakdar Gallery.

Oppenheim has had the honor of many solo and group exhibitions at international venues including the Guggenheim Museum, Museum of Modern Art and the New Museum in New York City, the FRAC Champagne-Ardenne in France, Guggenheim Museum Bilbao in Spain, the Museum of Modern Art of Republika Srpska in Bosnia, and the Royal Academy of Arts in London.

Exhibitions 
Oppenheim's solo exhibitions include Open Source, University of California, Riverside, California Museum of Photography (2009); Blood to Ghosts, Klosterfelde, Berlin (2010); Vapours and Veils, Klosterfelde, Berlin (2012); Intervention: Lisa Oppenheim, 21er Haus, The Belvedere Museum, Vienna (2012); Forever is Composed of Nows, Kunstverein in Hamburg, Germany (2014); From Abigail to Jacob (Works 2004–2014) at Grazer Kunstverein (2014) Graz, Austria.; Spine, MOCA Cleveland, Cleveland, Ohio (2017). Curated by Andria Hickey, the exhibition, explored the human spine in nature, in the body, and in labor. It featured repurposed photographs by Lewis Hine, textiles based on Pre-Columbian textiles in the collection of the Cleveland Museum of Art, and landscape portraits. A more recent exhibitions was The American Colony, The Approach, London (2019).

Awards 
- In 2014, Oppenheim was the recipient of the AIMIA/AGO Photography prize from the Art Gallery of Ontario.

- Shpilman International Photography prize from the Israel Museum.

Collections

Her work is included in the public collections of:
 FRAC Champagne-Ardenne, Reims, France
 FRAC Piemonte, France
 Kunstverein, Hamburg, Germany
 Israel Museum, Jerusalem, Israel
 Shpilman Institute of Photography, Tel Aviv, Israel
 Guggenheim Museum, New York, USA
 MIT List Visual Arts Center, Cambridge, MA, USA
 Museum of Modern Art, New York, USA
 Whitworth Art Gallery, Manchester, UK

References

External links
 Lisa Oppenheim's website
 Biography on Artsy
 Artist talk at Aperture Gallery, 2013 (20 minutes)

Brown University alumni
American women video artists
American video artists
Bard College alumni
1975 births
Living people
21st-century American women